Thomas Cass may refer to:

 Thomas Cass (colonel) (1821–1862), founder and commander of the 9th Regiment Massachusetts Volunteer Infantry of the Union Army
 Thomas Cass (surveyor) (1817–1895), pioneer surveyor in New Zealand